Muslim Hands is an international Non-governmental organization in over fifty two countries worldwide to help those affected by natural disasters, conflict and poverty. The organisation was established in 1993 in Nottingham, UK.

History 
Muslim Hands was established in 1993 in response to the crisis in Bosnia at the time. The charity began by sending aid to those in needs in the region.

Working in emergencies 
They regularly act on behalf of other UK NGOs to deliver aid supplies to areas where they have an existing field office or volunteers.

They have been present on the ground for widely publicised disasters such as the Asian tsunami of 2004, the Wars in Iraq and Afghanistan and the recent Horn of Africa. They have also been present for crises that have never attracted media attention such as the sub-zero winters in Kashmir, cholera outbreaks in Guinea Bissau and acute droughts in Somalia, Mali and Niger.

Awards and nominations 
In January 2013, Muslim Hands was nominated for the Charity of the Year award at the British Muslim Awards.

in 2019, Muslim Hands was awarded the Queen's Award for voluntary service.

Great Charity Gifts 

In 2020, Muslim Hands launched a new website dedicated to their Great Charity Gifts service. It allows donors to give a useful item to someone in need, in the name of a loved one.

References

External links 
 

Islamic charities based in the United Kingdom
Humanitarian aid organizations
Organizations established in 1993
Social welfare charities based in the United Kingdom
Charities based in Nottinghamshire
Poverty-related organizations